Luis Villalobos may refer to:
 Luis Villalobos (investor)
 Luis Villalobos (cyclist)